Bartlett Creek may refer to:

 Bartlett Creek, Lake County, California
 Bartlett Creek, Tuolumne County, California